is BoA's third single in Japan. It reached number 15 on the Oricon charts.

Track listing
 気持ちはつたわる (Feelings Deep Inside) (4:27)
 Next Step (5:10)
 Amazing Kiss (Groove That Soul Mix:English ver.) (4:40)
 気持ちはつたわる (Feelings Deep Inside) (Instrumental) (4:26)
 Next Step (Instrumental) (4:58)

Charts

BoA songs
2001 singles
2001 songs
Avex Trax singles
Torch songs
Songs with lyrics by Chinfa Kan